The 1976 Star World Championships were held in Nassau, Bahamas in 1976.

Results

References

Star World Championships
1976 in sailing
Sailing competitions in the Bahamas